The 2019 Orienteering World Cup was the 25th edition of the Orienteering World Cup. The 2019 Orienteering World Cup consisted of nine individual events and four relay events. The events are located in Finland, Norway, Switzerland and China. The 2019 World Orienteering Championships in Østfold, Norway are included in the World Cup.

Events

Men

Women

The results of the last round (sprint) were contested after excellent performances by Chinese competitors, leading to a delay of the official results. The International Orienteering Federation deemed that the results stood in March 2020 following a review, stating that "none of the alleged elements of the cheating claims occurred or can be substantiated", and that "analyses show that those who produced the best results are shown and known to be capable of such running speeds". The review was requested after the 2019 Military World Games, also held in China, in which Chinese competitors were disqualified from the middle race. This decision was upheld by the ethics committee (i.e the competitors remain disqualified).

Relay

Points distribution
The 40 best runners in each event are awarded points. The winner is awarded 100 points. In WC events 1 to 7, the six best results counts in the overall classification. In the finals (WC 8 and WC 9), both results counts.

Overall standings
This section shows the  overall standings after all nine individual events.

Men

Women

Relay
The table shows the  standings after all four relay events. All results count in the overall standings.

References

External links
 World Cup Ranking - IOF

Orienteering World Cup seasons
Orienteering competitions
2019 in orienteering